Maurice Richard (1921–2000), was a Canadian ice hockey player.

Maurice Richard may also refer to:

 People
Maurice Richard (politician) (born 1946), Canadian politician from Quebec
  (1832-1888)

 Things named after the hockey player
 Maurice Richard (film) or The Rocket, a film about the ice hockey player
 Maurice-Richard, a provincial electoral district in Quebec
 Maurice "Rocket" Richard Trophy, awarded annually to the leading goal scorer in the NHL
 Statue of Maurice Richard, outside the Bell Centre, Montreal, Quebec, Canada

See also 
 Maurice Richards (born 1945), Welsh dual-code rugby player
 Richard Maurice (1893-1955), American silent-era filmmaker
 Richard Maurice (explorer) (1859-1909), Australian explorer